Hajia Gali is a village located in the Nilan Valley of the Abbottabad District of Khyber Pakhtunkhwa province of Pakistan.

References

External links
 http://wikimapia.org/5776865/hajia-gali

Abbottabad District